This is the discography of American DJ and producer Audien. He has released one studio album, four extended plays, 34 singles, 33 remixes, and four music videos.

Studio albums

Extended plays

Singles

As featured artist

Remixes

Music videos

References

Discographies of American artists
Electronic music discographies